There have been many books published about Stephen King and his works.

 Date		Title 	Author 	Publisher 		

1981		Teacher's Manual: Novels of Stephen King	Edward J. Zagorski:	New American Library, Education Dept	
	
1984		Stephen King: The Art of Darkness: The Life and Fiction of the Master of the Macabre	Douglas E. Winter	Signet	Updated edition (December 2, 1986)	

1986		Kingdom of Fear: The World of Stephen King	Tim Underwood and Chuck Miller	Signet		

1987		The Gothic World of Stephen King: Landscape of Nightmares	Gary Hoppenstand, Ray B. Browne	Bowling Green State University Popular Press		

1988		Reign of Fear: The Fiction and Film of Stephen King (1982-1989)	Don Herron	Pan	
	
5/1/1988		Bare Bones: Conversations on Terror with Stephen King (1988)	Tim Underwood and Chuck Miller	McGraw-Hill	
	
1988		Landscape of Fear: Stephen King's American Gothic 	Tony Magistrale	Bowling Green State University Popular Press	
	
1989		Feast of Fear: Conversations with Stephen King (1989)	Tim Underwood and Chuck Miller	Grand Central Publishing	
	
1989		The Stephen King Companion	George Beahm	Macdonald	
	
4/1/1988		The Unseen King	Tyson Blue	Borgo Pr	
	
8/7/1990		The Stephen King Quiz Book	Stephen Spignesi	Signet		

1991		The Complete Stephen King Encyclopedia (includes art by Steve Fiorilla, Jim McDermott and others)	Stephen Spignesi	Contemporary Books;	
	
6/1991		Shape Under the Sheet: The Complete Stephen King Encyclopedia	Stephen J Spignesi	 Popular Culture Ink	
	
3/27/1992		The Dark Descent: Essays Defining Stephen King's Horrorscape	Tony Magistrale (Ed.)	Praeger		

1992		The Second Stephen King Quiz Book	Stephen Spignesi	Signet 	
	
1994		Stephen King's AmericaBy 	Jonathan P. Davis	Bowling Green State University Popular Press	

11/1/1997		Ultimate Unauthorized Stephen King Trivia Challenge: Hundreds of Brainteasing Questions on Minute Details and Little-Known Facts about the World's Leading Horror Writer and His Work	Robert W. Bly	Kensington	
	
1998		Stephen King (part of series Modern {literary} Critical Views)	Harold Bloom (Ed.)	Chelsea House	
	
1998		The Lost Work of Stephen King: A Guide to Unpublished Manuscripts, Story Fragments, Alternative Versions and Oddities	Stephen Spignesi	Birch Lane Press	
	
2000		Science and Destabilization in the Modern American Gothic: Lovecraft, Matheson, and King	David A. Oakes	Greenwood Press		

2001		The Stephen King Universe; A Guide to the Worlds of Stephen King	Stanley Wiater, Christopher Golden, Hank Wagner	Cemetery Dance		

3/8/2001		The Modern Weird Tale 	S. T. Joshi	McFarland	
	
5/1/2001		The Essential Stephen King:   A Ranking of the Greatest Novels, Short Stories, Movies, and Other Creations of the World's Most Popular Writer	Stephen Spignesi:	New Page Books		

2002		Revisiting Stephen King: A Critical Companion	Sharon A. Russell	Greenwood Press	
	
2002		The Literary Equivalent of a Big Mac and Fries?: Academics, Moralists, and the Stephen King Phenomenon	Smith, Greg	The Midwest Quarterly, Vol. 43, No. 4, Summer 2002	
	
2003		The Complete Guide to the Works of Stephen King First and Second Editions 2004: Third Edition	Rocky Wood, David Rawsthorne, Norma Blackburn	Kanrock Partners	
	
2004		"Diabolical Dreaming in Stephen King's ""The Man in the Black Suit"""	Hansen, Tom	The Midwest Quarterly, Vol. 45, No. 3, Spring 2004	
	
12/2005		The Road to the Dark Tower	Bev Vincent	Cemetery Dance 		

2005		The Illustrated Stephen King Trivia Book	Brian Freeman & Bev Vincent	Cemetery Dance 		

5/30/2006		The Complete Stephen King Universe: A Guide to the Worlds of Stephen King	Stanley Wiater, Christopher Golden, Hank Wagner	St. Martin's Griffin;		

3/2006		Stephen King: Uncollected, Unpublished	Rocky Wood, with David Rawsthorne and Norma Blackburn	Cemetery Dance 		

2007		The Stephen King Collector's Guide	Rocky Wood and Justin Brooks	Kanrock Partners	
	
2008		Stephen King: A Primary Bibliography of the World's Most Popular Author	Justin Brooks	Cemetery Dance 		

12/2008		Stephen King: A Biography	Albert Rolls	Greenwood Publishing Group, Incorporated	
	
4/2009		Stephen King: The Non-Fiction	Rocky Wood and Justin Brooks	Cemetery Dance 		

7/15/2009		Stephen King on the Big Screen	Mark Browning	Intellect, Limited	
	
2009		The Stephen King Illustrated Companion: The Life and Works of the Master of Horror	Bev Vincent	Fall River Press	
	
2009		Stephen King: A Biography	Albert Rolls	Greenwood Press		

3/1/2010		Stephen King's The Dark Tower: The Complete Concordance	Robin Furth 	Cemetery Dance 		

8/3/2010		Lilja's Library: The World of Stephen King	Hans-Ake Lilja	Cemetery Dance 		

2010		Stephen King: America's Storyteller	Tony Magistrale	Praeger		

6/7/2011		Stephen King Is Richard Bachman	Michael  R Collings, Stephen King 	Overlook Connection 	
	
2011		The Stephen King Movie Quiz Book	Andrew J. Rausch and Ronald Riley	BearManor Media		

5/27/2011		The Wit and Wisdom of Stephen King	Andrew J. Rausch:	: BearManor Media	
	
4/11/2011		Stephen King: A Literary Companion	Rocky Wood and Justin Brooks	McFarland	
	
8/15/2011		Stephen King's Gothic	John Sears	University of Wales Press	
	
9/13/2013		The Illustrated Stephen King MOVIE Trivia Book	Brian James Freeman, Kevin Quigley, and Hans-Ake Lilja	Cemetery Dance 		

9/13/2013		The Illustrated Stephen King Trivia Book: Revised & Updated 2nd Edition!	Brian James Freeman & Bev Vincent	Cemetery Dance 		

2/1/2014		Stephen King Films FAQ: All That's Left to Know About the King of Horror on Film	Scott Von Doviak	Applause Theatre & Cinema Books		

10/1/2015		The Stephen King Companion : Four Decades of Fear from the Master of Horror	George Beahm	St. Martin's Press	
	
12/28/2015		The Dark Tower Companion	Bev Vincent	Cemetery Dance 		
3/22/2016		Stephen King's The Dark Tower: The Complete Concordance (Revised & Updated!)	Robin Furth	Cemetery Dance 		

Summer 2017 The Linguistics of Stephen King by James Arthur Anderson  McFarland& Company, Inc. 		

9/1/2017		ENTERTAINMENT WEEKLY The Ultimate Guide to Stephen King	The Editors Of Entertainment Weekly 	Entertainment Weekly 	
	
2/26/2018		Bumpty-Bumpty-Bump!: The Stephen King Daily Reader (Kindle edition)	Michael Roch

6/12/2018		America's Dark Theologian-The Religious Imagination Of Stephen King     Douglas E. Cowan          New York University Press

10/16/2018		Stephen King, American Master: A Creepy Corpus of Facts About Stephen King & His Work	Stephen Spignesi	Permuted Press

2/05/2019		Perspectives on Stephen King: Conversations with Authors, Experts and Collaborators   Andrew J. Rausch       McFarland & Company

Material about King can also be found in his own partly autobiographical On Writing: A Memoir of the Craft (2000), as well as scattered throughout King's Danse Macabre (1981).

A critical analysis of King's work can be found in S. T. Joshi's The Modern Weird Tale (2001).

Notes

Stephen King
Bibliographies of people
Horror fiction bibliographies